Rick "Rocky" Lockridge (January 10, 1959 – February 7, 2019) was an American professional boxer. He is perhaps best known for having handed Roger Mayweather his first defeat—a first-round knockout in just 98 seconds—earning him the WBA and lineal super featherweight titles. He later won the IBF super featherweight title. He is also known from his 2010 appearance on the A&E television series Intervention.

Early life and career
Rocky Lockridge was born on January 10, 1959, in Tacoma, Washington. After relocating to Paterson, New Jersey, at 19 years old in 1978, he made his debut fight in the professional ring on August 9, defeating Tony Reed by TKO. On September 18, 1979, he defeated Gerald Hayes via unanimous decision to win the New Jersey State Featherweight Championship, and on February 19, 1980, he won by TKO against Fel Clemente to win the USA Featherweight Champion title.

On October 4, 1980, he fought for the WBA World Featherweight title against Eusebio Pedroza, losing by a majority decision; this defeat was Lockridge's first in the professional ring. On April 6, 1981, he retained the New Jersey featherweight title by defeating Ernesto Gonzalez by unanimous decision. On August 22, 1981, in a fight for the US featherweight title, he was knocked out by Juan Laporte. On April 24, 1983, he met Pedroza again in the fight for the WBA featherweight title, losing by unanimous decision.

On February 26, 1984, he knocked out the undefeated Roger Mayweather in round one and won the WBA junior-lightweight world championship. After defeating Mayweather, Lockridge and his wife Carolyn moved to Mount Laurel, New Jersey, where they gave birth to twin sons Ricky and Lamar on August 23, 1984. Lockridge made two successful title defenses: on June 12, 1984, he won by TKO in round eleven against Tae Jin Moon, and on January 27, 1985, he won by TKO in round six against Kamel Bou-Ali, a future WBO world junior-lightweight champion himself. However, on May 15 of the same year, he lost the title by majority decision to Wilfredo Gómez.

On August 3, 1986, he lost by majority decision in the fight for the WBC world junior-lightweight title to the undefeated Julio César Chávez. On August 9, 1987, Lockridge defeated Barry Michael after Michael refused to continue the fight after the 8th round and won the IBF world junior-lightweight championship. On October 25, 1987, he defeated Johnny de la Rosa and defended the title, and on April 2, 1988, by unanimous decision, he defeated Harold Knight and again defended his title. On July 23, 1988, he lost by unanimous decision to Tony Lopez and lost his title to the Mexican-American. On March 5, 1989, a rematch took place between Lopez and Lockridge, which ended in the same way as the first fight. After the second defeat to Lopez, Lockridge retired following a victory against Mike Zena in 1989.

Later years and death
Lockridge returned with his family to Tacoma in 1991 – 18 months following his retirement from boxing – and he and Carolyn separated shortly thereafter due to financial stress and Rocky's drug addiction. 30 months after his original retirement, Lockridge attempted a comeback under new management in Washington, but both his fights in this period ended in losses. In 1993, Lockridge moved to Camden, New Jersey, alone, and he began working as a cleaner and painter for a drum and barrel company in January 1994. Shortly after, he was arrested for burglary and sentenced to five years probation. Three years later, he was arrested on a similar charge and served 27 months in prison before being released in July 1999. Lockridge spent the following years in homelessness, living on a monthly $140 and food stamps provided by the government, as well as pocket change from panhandling. He suffered a stroke in 2006, requiring him to use a cane.

Lockridge was eventually brought by his family onto the A&E television series Intervention in 2010. A scene from the episode, in which an emotional Lockridge loudly wails, became an internet meme titled "best cry ever". Following this appearance, Lockridge spent 90 days in a facility, and had remained sober since. Lockridge died on February 7, 2019, at the age of 60, after being placed on home hospice care following multiple strokes. He was removed from life support about one week prior to his death. In the weeks preceding his death, he was hooked to a feeding tube due to an inability to swallow, and suffered from aspiration pneumonia. His caretaker had set up a GoFundMe to help cover his medical expenses.

Professional boxing record

See also
List of super featherweight boxing champions
List of WBA world champions
List of IBF world champions

References

External links

Rocky Lockridge - CBZ Profile

1959 births
2019 deaths
Boxers from Washington (state)
Bantamweight boxers
African-American boxers
Super-featherweight boxers
Sportspeople from Tacoma, Washington
Sportspeople from Dallas
Sportspeople from Paterson, New Jersey
Internet memes
International Boxing Federation champions
World Boxing Association champions
American male boxers
20th-century African-American sportspeople
21st-century African-American people